Charles Elmé Francatelli (180510 August 1876) was an Italian British cook, known for his cookery books popular in the Victorian era, such as The Modern Cook.

Biography
Francatelli was born in London, of Italian descent, in 1805. He was educated in France, where he studied the art of cookery under Marie-Antoine Carême. Returning to England, he was employed successively by various noblemen, subsequently becoming chief chef of the St James's Club, popularly known as Crockford's club. He left Crockford's to become chief cook to Queen Victoria from 9 March 1840 to 31 March 1842, and then returned to Crockford's. He was managing steward of the Coventry House Club from the day it opened on 1 June 1846 until it closed on 25 March 1854, and at the Reform Club from 1854 to 1861. He was manager of the St James's Hotel, at the corner of Berkeley Street and Piccadilly, from 1863 to 1870. He worked as chef de cuisine to the Prince and Princess of Wales at the nearby Marlborough House from early 1863 until at least late September 1866. From 1870 to 76 he was manager of the Freemasons' Tavern. He died at Eastbourne.

Works
Francatelli was the author of The Modern Cook (1846), A Plain Cookery Book for the Working Classes (1852), The Cook's Guide and Housekeeper's & Butler's Assistant (1861), and of The Royal English and Foreign Confectioner (1862).

A Plain Cookery Book for the Working Classes was reprinted in 1993, complete with the original advertisements and introduction.

Reception

Clarissa Dickson Wright, describing Francatelli as "the Italian confectioner", describes him as liking "his elaborate sugar decorations. He also talks about making pearls, birds and feathers out of sugar to decorate your dessert course." She compares it to a meal in Daisy Ashford's The Young Visiters, and comments that while such fiddly decoration may have looked good, she wasn't sure it did anything for the taste.

In media
In Victoria Charles Francatelli is played by Ferdinand Kingsley. In the series, Francatelli works at the palace for several years until he marries Nancy Skerrett, the Queen's Head Dresser, and the couple leaves the palace to open their own hotel. But in real life, Francatelli never married the Queen's Head Dresser (whose real name was Marianne Skerrett).

See also
Brown Windsor soup

References

External links
 
 
Online version of Francatelli's The Cook's Guide and Housekeeper's & Butler's Assistant
 Online version of Francatelli`s The Cook`s Guide and Housekeeper`s & Butler`s Assistant

1805 births
1876 deaths
English chefs
English people of Italian descent
Queen Victoria